The 1924–25 season was Manchester United's 29th season in the Football League.

At the end of the season, United finished second and were promoted back to the First Division as runners-up after three seasons in the Second Division.

Second Division

FA Cup

References

Manchester United F.C. seasons
Manchester United